Michael Clarke is an Australian ornithologist.  He is a professor at La Trobe University in Melbourne, Victoria, where he has worked since 1992.  He is especially known for his research into the evolution of cooperative breeding in honeyeaters, particularly the genus Manorina and for his work on the response of fauna and flora to wildfire (Clarke 2008, Clarke et al. 2010).   In 2007 he was the recipient of the D. L. Serventy Medal, awarded by the Royal Australasian Ornithologists Union for outstanding published work on birds in the Australasian region.

Select Bibliography
Clarke MF, (2008) Catering for the needs of fauna in fire management: science or just wishful thinking? Wildlife Research 35:385-394

Clarke, M.F., Avitabile, S.C., Brown, L., Callister, K.E., Haslem, A., Holland, G.J., Kelly, L.T., Kenny, S.A., Nimmo, D.G., Spence-Bailey, L.M., Taylor, R.S., Watson, S.J., & Bennett, A.F. (2010) Ageing mallee eucalypt vegetation after fire: insights for successional trajectories in semiarid mallee ecosystems. Australian Journal of Botany 58: 363–372.

References

External links
 , Department of Zoology, La Trobe University

Australian ornithologists
Living people
Year of birth missing (living people)